New Hampshire Route 152 (abbreviated NH 152) is a  east–west highway in Rockingham and Strafford counties in southeastern New Hampshire. It runs from an intersection with U.S. Route 4 near the Northwood/Nottingham town line east to an intersection with New Hampshire Route 108 in Newmarket.

Route description 
NH 152 begins at US 4 in Northwood, just yards west of the Nottingham town line.  The highway proceeds southeast into the town center, where it intersects with NH 156, a short connector to Raymond to the south.  NH 152 continues southeast into Lee, then turns due east and crosses NH 125, followed by NH 155 shortly thereafter. The highway traverses the southern edge of Lee, then crosses into Newmarket.  NH 152 continues east into downtown Newmarket, terminating at NH 108 in the town center.

Major intersections

References

External links

 New Hampshire State Route 152 on Flickr

152
Transportation in Rockingham County, New Hampshire
Transportation in Strafford County, New Hampshire